The following outline is provided as an overview of and topical guide to Ascension Island:

Ascension Island – island in the South Atlantic Ocean, around 966 miles (1,600 km) from the coast of Africa. It is part of the British overseas territory of Saint Helena, Ascension and Tristan da Cunha; Saint Helena itself is 800 miles (1,287 km) to the south east.  The Island is named after the day of its recorded discovery, Ascension Day.  It is located at 7.56° S, 14.25° W.

The island is the location of Wideawake Airfield, which is a joint facility of the Royal Air Force and the United States Air Force.

General reference

 Pronunciation:
 Common English country name: Ascension Island
 Official English country name: Ascension Island
 Common endonym(s):  
 Official endonym(s):  
 Adjectival(s)
 Demonym(s)
 Etymology: Name of Ascension Island
 ISO region code: SH-AC
 Internet country code top-level domain: .ac

Geography  

Geography of Ascension Island
 Ascension Island is: an island, and a part of the British overseas territory of Saint Helena, Ascension and Tristan da Cunha
 Location: 7.56° S, 14.25° W
 Western Hemisphere and Southern Hemisphere
 Atlantic Ocean
 South Atlantic (east of Brazil, midway between South America and Africa)
 Time zone:  Greenwich Mean Time (UTC+00)
 Extreme points of Ascension Island
 High:  Green Mountain 
 Low:  South Atlantic Ocean 0 m
 Land boundaries:  none
 Coastline:  South Atlantic Ocean
 Population of Ascension Island: 1,100
 Area of Ascension Island:  - 222nd largest country
 Atlas of Ascension Island

Environment  

 Climate of Ascension Island
 Environmental issues on Ascension Island
 Renewable energy in Ascension Island
 Geology of Ascension Island
 Protected areas of Ascension Island
 Biosphere reserves in Ascension Island
 National parks of Ascension Island
 Wildlife of Ascension Island
 Fauna of Ascension Island
 Birds of Ascension Island
 Mammals of Ascension Island

Natural geographic features of Ascension Island 

 Fjords of Ascension Island
 Glaciers of Ascension Island
 Islands of Ascension Island
 Lakes of Ascension Island
 Mountains of Ascension Island
 Volcanoes in Ascension Island
 Rivers of Ascension Island
 Waterfalls of Ascension Island
 Valleys of Ascension Island
 World Heritage Sites in Ascension Island: None

Regions  

Regions of Ascension Island

Ecoregions  

List of ecoregions in Ascension Island

Administrative divisions of Ascension Island 
None.

Demography 

Demographics of Ascension Island

Government and politics  

 Form of government:
 Capital of Ascension Island: Georgetown
 Elections in Ascension Island

Branches of government

Government of Ascension Island

Executive branch  
 Head of state: British monarch
 Head of government: Governor of Saint Helena, Ascension and Tristan da Cunha
 Administrator of Ascension Island

Legislative branch  
 Ascension Island Council

Judicial branch  

Court system of Saint Helena
 Saint Helena Supreme Court

Foreign relations 

Foreign relations of Ascension Island
 Diplomatic missions in Ascension Island
 Diplomatic missions of Ascension Island

Law and order 

Law of Ascension Island
 Constitution of Ascension Island
 Crime in Ascension Island
 Human rights in Ascension Island
 LGBT rights in Ascension Island
 Freedom of religion in Ascension Island
 Law enforcement in Ascension Island

Military 
 Commander-in-Chief: Governor of Saint Helena, Ascension and Tristan da Cunha
 RAF Ascension Island (with US presence too)

Local government  

Local government in Ascension Island

History  

History of Ascension Island
Timeline of the history of Ascension Island
Current events of Ascension Island
 Military history of Ascension Island

Culture 

Culture of Ascension Island
 Architecture of Ascension Island
 Cuisine of Ascension Island
 Festivals in Ascension Island
 Languages of Ascension Island
 Media in Ascension Island
 National symbols of Ascension Island
 Coat of arms of Ascension Island
 Flag of Ascension Island
 National anthem of Ascension Island
 People of Ascension Island
 Public holidays in Ascension Island
 Records of Ascension Island
 Religion in Ascension Island
 Christianity in Ascension Island
 Hinduism in Ascension Island
 Islam in Ascension Island
 Judaism in Ascension Island
 Sikhism in Ascension Island
 World Heritage Sites in Ascension Island: None

Art in Ascension Island 
 Art in Ascension Island
 Cinema of Ascension Island
 Literature of Ascension Island
 Music of Ascension Island
 Television in Ascension Island
 Theatre in Ascension Island

Sports in Ascension Island 

Sports in Ascension Island
 Football in Ascension Island
 Ascension Island at the Olympics

Economy and infrastructure of Ascension Island 

Economy of Ascension Island
 Economic rank, by nominal GDP (2007):
 Agriculture in Ascension Island
 Banking in Ascension Island
 National Bank of Ascension Island
 Communications in Ascension Island
 Internet in Ascension Island
 Companies of Ascension Island
Currency of Ascension Island: Pound
ISO 4217: SHP
 Energy in Ascension Island
 Energy in Ascension Island
 Energy policy of Ascension Island
 Oil industry in Ascension Island
 Health care in Ascension Island
 Mining in Ascension Island
 Tourism in Ascension Island
 Transport in Ascension Island
 Airports in Ascension Island
 Rail transport in Ascension Island
 Roads in Ascension Island

Education in Ascension Island 

Education in Ascension Island

See also 

Ascension Island

Index of Ascension Island–related articles
List of Ascension Island-related topics
List of international rankings
Outline of Africa
Outline of geography
Outline of Saint Helena
Outline of the United Kingdom

References

External links

Ascension Island Newspaper
Ascension Island Government
Rocket launches from Ascension
CIA World Factbook entry about Saint Helena
Live Web Cam of Ascension
Cable and Wireless
Colonial History of Ascension Island

Ascension Island
Ascension Island